The Kraft Heinz Company (KHC), commonly known as Kraft Heinz, is an American multinational food company formed by the merger of Kraft Foods and H.J. Heinz Company co-headquartered in Chicago and Pittsburgh. Kraft Heinz is the third-largest food and beverage company in North America and the fifth-largest in the world with over $26.0 billion in annual sales as of 2021.

In addition to Kraft and Heinz, over 20 other brands are part of the company's profile including Boca Burger, Gevalia, Grey Poupon, Oscar Mayer, Philadelphia Cream Cheese, Primal Kitchen, and Wattie's, eight of which have total individual sales of over $1 billion. Kraft Heinz ranked 114th in the 2018 Fortune 500 list of the largest United States corporations based on 2017 total revenue.

History

The merger of Kraft Foods and H.J. Heinz was agreed to by the boards of both companies, with approval by shareholders and regulatory authorities in early 2015. The new Kraft Heinz Company became the world's fifth-largest food and beverage company and the third-largest in the United States. The Kraft Heinz co-headquarters are in Chicago at the Aon Center and in Pittsburgh at PPG Place, with other offices across the United States, Canada, South America, Europe, Asia, and Australia. The merger was completed on July 2, 2015.

The merger in 2015 did not immediately affect the naming rights to Heinz Field in Pittsburgh PA, home of the Pittsburgh Steelers. In July 2022 reports leaked that the company did not renew the rights, which Heinz initially acquired in 2001.

On February 17, 2017, it was reported that Kraft Heinz Co. had made a $143 billion approach to take over the British-Dutch multinational Unilever, a significantly larger competitor with 126,000 more employees and £24bn larger revenue than Kraft Heinz. Unilever declined the initial proposal. The takeover was subsequently abandoned on February 19 soon after UK Prime Minister Theresa May had ordered a scrutiny of the deal.

On October 19, 2017, Kraft Heinz announced that it was acquiring Cerebos Pacific, including the Saxa salt, Gregg's, and Bisto brands, from Suntory. On March 9, 2018, New Zealand's Commerce Commission approved the purchase, on the condition that they sell the licenses for Gregg's brand of sauces and the F. Whitlock Worcestershire sauce brand due to competition concerns.

In May 2018, Kraft Heinz launched Springboard Brands, a business focused on growing organic, natural, and "super-premium" food brands. Later that year, it was announced Kraft Heinz would acquire the Primal Kitchen brand as part of the company's Springboard Incubator. The $200 million deal was completed in early 2019 and was expected to generate $50 million in new annual revenue.

On October 24, 2018, Kraft Heinz announced that it was selling its Indian nutritional beverage assets, including Complan and energy drink Glucon-D to Zydus Wellness. The sale was completed on January 30, 2019.

In April 2019, it was announced Miguel Patricio, former Chief Marketing Officer of InBev would replace Bernardo Hees as CEO of Kraft Heinz. Patricio took position of CEO in late June 2019 and Alex Behring remained chairman of the company. Later that year, Paulo Basilio returned to his role at Chief Financial Officer and Corrado Azzarita assumed the position of Chief Information Officer.

In June 2019, Kraft Heinz reached a milestone in achieving a 100 percent Corporate Equality Index score from the Human Rights Campaign. The score recognized the company for its LGBTQ inclusion efforts and becoming a leader in the area among food CPG companies. On July 2, 2019, Kraft Heinz sold its Canadian natural cheese business, including the Cracker Barrel, P’tit Quebec and aMOOza! brands to Parmalat for C$1.62 billion.

In September 2020, Kraft Heinz reached a deal to sell part of its cheese business to French multinational dairy products corporation Lactalis for $3.2 billion. The sale included the Breakstone's, Knudsen, Polly-O, Athenos, Hoffman's, and Cracker Barrel cheese brands for the United States, and Cheez Whiz outside of North America. Kraft Heinz then partnered with Lactalis to manufacture Kraft and Velveeta cheeses. On November 10, 2021, the U.S. Justice Department approved the acquisition on the condition that they divest the Athenos and Polly-O businesses. The sale was completed on November 29. The divestiture of Athenos to Emmi Roth was completed on December 1, while the divestiture of Polly-O to BelGioiso was completed on December 3.

On September 15, 2020, Kraft Heinz announced its new Strategic Transformation Plan including a new company purpose, "Let's Make Life Delicious" and an all new vision, "To sustainably grow by delighting more consumers globally." The next day Kraft Heinz also released its updated 2020 Environmental Social Governance (ESG) report with goals to make 100% of Kraft Heinz product packaging recyclable, reusable, or compostable by 2025 and plans to sustainably source 100 percent of Heinz Ketchup tomatoes by 2025.

On February 11, 2021, Kraft Heinz announced its Q4 2020 and full year results resulting in 6.2 percent increased sales and over $26 billion in revenue. The same day, Kraft Heinz announced their plans to sell its nuts business, including the Planters brand to Hormel for $3.35 billion. The transaction was completed on June 7.

In September 2021, Kraft Heinz announced that Hemmer, a Brazilian company focused on condiments and sauces, was being acquired for an undisclosed amount. This acquisition followed the recent agreement to purchase Assan Foods – a Turkish company focused on sauces – belonging to Kibar Holding, for approximately $100 million.

On January 19, 2022, Kraft Heinz announced that it had completed its acquisition of an 85% stake in Germany-based Just Spices GmbH. Launched in 2014, Just Spices is a start-up with annual sales of approximately €60 million. Its 170-plus product portfolio includes spice blends, salad dressings, easy-to-prepare “In Minutes” blends, and organic offerings for diverse meal occasions ranging from breakfast and light snacks to salads and baking, with a broad range of savory, sweet, classic, and exotic flavors. The proposed deal was first announced on Dec. 10, 2021.

United Kingdom 
In late 2016, the UK and European headquarters moved from Hayes to the Shard in London.

Brands 
As of 2021, a partial list of global brands included in the Kraft Heinz portfolio:

Kraft and Heinz:

 Kraft Dinner
 Kraft Parmesan Cheese

Other:

 A.1. Sauce
 ABC
 Amoy
 Aproten
 Baker's Chocolate
 Bénédicta
 Boca Burger
 Breakstone's
 Brinta
 Capri Sun
 Classico
 Claussen pickles
 Corn Nuts
 Cracker Barrel (cheese brand)
 Crystal Light
 Daddies
 De Ruijter
 Greenseas
 Grey Poupon
 Golden Circle
 Hemmer
 Honig
 HP Sauce
 Jell-O
 Karvan Cévitam
 Kool-Aid
 Lea & Perrins
 Lunchables
 Master Soy Sauce
 Maxwell House
 Mio
 Miracle Whip
 Mr. Yoshida's
 Nancy's
 Ore Ida
 Bagel Bites
 Original Juice Co.
 Orlando
 Oscar Mayer
 P3
 Philadelphia Cream Cheese
 Plasmon
 Primal Kitchen
 Pudliszki
 PurePet
 Quero
 Roosvicee
 Shake 'n Bake
 Smart Ones
 Sure-Jeil
 Tassimo
 Twisted Ranch
 Velveeta
 Venz
 Wattie's
 Wijko
 Wyler's

Finance 
For the fiscal year 2017, Kraft Heinz reported earnings of 11.0 billion, with an annual revenue of 26.2 billion, a decline of 0.6% over the previous fiscal cycle. Kraft Heinz's shares traded at over $61 per share, and its market capitalization was valued at over 136 billion in September 2018.

In February 2019, shares in Kraft Heinz fell to a record low of under $35, after the company reported a $10.2bn loss for the previous year as the company announced that it would take a $15.4 billion write-down of its Kraft and Oscar Mayer brands, cut its dividend, and acknowledged that the U.S. Securities and Exchange Commission had opened a probe into its accounting practices. In August 2019, Kraft Heinz announced a further $1.22 billion in write-downs, as well as the return of its former CFO, Paulo Basilio, who held the position until 2017, to replace David Knopf, saying that it wanted a "seasoned veteran" following a series of accounting errors. 

On February 21, 2019, Kraft Heinz reported that they received a Securities and Exchange Commission (SEC) subponea in October that aimed to look into the company's accounting policies and internal controls. Kraft Heinz also announced that they slashed their dividend from 62.5 cents a share to 40 cents. The company also announced a goodwill impairment charge that wrote down the value of the company's Kraft and Oscar Mayer brands of $15.4 billion in the fourth quarter, which resulted in a net loss of $12.61 billion. The all-resulting news made the company's stock crash more than 20% in after-hours trading. The stock plunge resulted in Berkshire Hathaway, the largest stockowner, a write down of $3 billion and a stock value loss of $4.3 billion just a day before Berkshire Hathaway's quarterly earnings and annual report to investors.

In September 2020, Kraft Heinz announced its new enterprise strategy including plans to cut $2 billion in costs over five years resulting in an estimated generation of 4% to 6% adjusted earnings per share growth. The announcement resulted in multiple stock upgrades by CFRA and Guggenheim due to the renewed positive financial outlook of the company.

In September 2021, Kraft Heinz was fined $62m to settle the U.S. Securities and Exchange Commission probe into its improper claim of $200m in cost savings. The $200 million in "bogus cost savings" (reportedly from merger) forced the company restate its financial results for the years 2015 through 2018.

Lawsuits 
In 2017, the claim that the Kraft Parmesan Cheese label was misleading was rejected by judges. The label reads "Kraft 100% Grated Parmesan Cheese". It was argued that the consumer would know it couldn't be 100% cheese as any dairy product degrades quickly without preservatives.

See also

 List of food companies
 List of brand name food products
 List of dairy product companies in the United States

References

Further reading

External links

 

 
American companies established in 2015
Berkshire Hathaway
Brand name condiments
Condiment companies of the United States
Dairy products companies of the United States
Food and drink companies based in Chicago
Food and drink companies established in 2015
Manufacturing companies based in Pittsburgh
Multinational companies headquartered in the United States
Multinational dairy companies
Multinational food companies